Kagitumba is a town in Rwanda. It is located at the extreme North Eastern extremity at the confluence of the Kagitumba River and Akagera River. This location is also the tri-point border between Rwanda, Uganda and Tanzania.

Location
Kagitumba is located in Nyagatare District, Eastern Province, at the border with the Republic of Uganda. Its location lies very close and is immediately west of the geographical point where the International borders of Rwanda, Tanzania and Uganda intersect.
The coordinates of the town are:1° 4' 20.00"S, 30° 27' 0.00"E (Latitude:-1.072223; Longitude:30.450000).

Overview
Kagitumba is one of the major border crossing points between Rwanda and Uganda; the other being Gatuna. Currently, plans are underway to integrate customs and immigration clearance procedures between the two countries, to create a one-stop clearance mechanism in both directions. When formalised, the new process will dramatically cut down waiting times for both human and commercial traffic between the two East African Community member countries.

Population
The exact population of Kagitumba, Rwanda is not known as of April 2012.

Points of Interest
The landmarks within the town limits or close to the edges of town include:

 Offices of Kagitumba Town Council
 Kagitumba Central Market
 The International Border Crossing between Rwanda and Uganda
 The town of Mirama Hills, in Uganda, lies across the International border, directly north of Kagitumba
 The point where River Muvumba empties into River Kagera, to mark the intersection of the International borders between Rwanda, Tanzania and Uganda

External links
 Location of Kagitumba At Google Maps

See also
 Mirama Hills
 Nyagatare District
 Eastern Province, Rwanda
 Nyagatare
 River Kagera
 River Muvumba

References

Nyagatare District
Eastern Province, Rwanda
Populated places in Rwanda
Rwanda–Uganda border crossings